Alysh as a part of belt wrestling competition was contested at the 2017 Asian Indoor and Martial Arts Games in Ashgabat, Turkmenistan from 22 to 23 September 2017. The competition took place at Ashgabat Main Indoor Arena.

Medalists

Men's freestyle

Men's classic style

Women's freestyle

Women's classic style

Medal table

Results

Men's freestyle

60 kg
22 September

70 kg
22 September

80 kg
22 September

90 kg
22 September

100 kg
22 September

+100 kg
22 September

Men's classic style

60 kg
23 September

70 kg
23 September

80 kg
23 September

90 kg
23 September

100 kg
23 September

+100 kg
23 September

Women's freestyle

55 kg
22 September

60 kg
22 September

65 kg
22 September

 Gülnar Haýytbaýewa of Turkmenistan originally won the gold medal, but was disqualified after she tested positive for Methylhexaneamine and 1,3-Dimethylbutylamine.
 Dinara Hallyýewa of Turkmenistan originally won the silver medal, but was disqualified after she tested positive for Meldonium.

70 kg
22 September

75 kg
22 September

 Nasiba Surkiýewa of Turkmenistan originally won the gold medal, but was disqualified after she tested positive for Methylhexaneamine and 1,3-Dimethylbutylamine.

+75 kg
22 September

Women's classic style

55 kg
23 September

60 kg
23 September

65 kg
23 September

 Dinara Hallyýewa of Turkmenistan originally won the gold medal, but was disqualified after she tested positive for Meldonium.

70 kg
23 September

75 kg
23 September

 Nasiba Surkiýewa of Turkmenistan originally finished fifth, but was disqualified after she tested positive for Methylhexaneamine and 1,3-Dimethylbutylamine.

+75 kg
23 September

References 

 Belt Wrestling Results Book

External links
 Official website

2017 Asian Indoor and Martial Arts Games events
Asian Indoor and Martial Arts Games
2017 Alysh